The Afro-American Historical and Genealogical Society (AAHGS) is a Washington, D.C. based organization which pursues scholarly and educational work on the genealogy and history of African American citizens. It was founded in May 1977, with James Dent Walker serving as its first president. Other founding officers included Marcia Jesiek Eisenberg, Marsha M. Greenlee, Paul Edward Sluby, Sr., Debra Newman Ham, and Jean Sampson Scott. It currently serves 34 state chapters and a chapter for the District of Columbia, and it is a member society of the Federation of Genealogical Societies.

The AAHGS publishes a scholastic journal on its members' work in the field of African American genealogy.

Notable people
 Sherri Camp, is the current president and a native of Topeka, Kansas.
 Catherine Stokes, is a retired deputy director of the Illinois Department of Public Health and a community volunteer. She is a pioneering African-American member of the Church of Jesus Christ of Latter-day Saints.

References

External links
 http://www.aahgs.org/

Genealogical societies in the United States
Organizations established in 1977
Black studies organizations
African-American genealogy